John Andrew Sommers (October 26, 1865 – July 22, 1908) was an American professional baseball catcher. He played in Major League Baseball from 1887 to 1890 and remained active in the minor leagues through 1896.

External links

1865 births
1908 deaths
19th-century baseball players
Major League Baseball catchers
New York Metropolitans players
Boston Beaneaters players
Chicago White Stockings players
Indianapolis Hoosiers (NL) players
New York Giants (NL) players
Cleveland Spiders players
Cleveland Forest Cities players
Hamilton Clippers players
Lima Lushers players
Evansville Hoosiers players
Minneapolis Millers (baseball) players
Terre Haute Hottentots players
Quincy Ravens players
Quincy Bluebirds players
Baseball players from Cleveland